Khanpur Khurd, is a village, which is the location of Indira Gandhi Super Thermal Power Project, in Matanhail tehsil of Jhajjar District in the state of Haryana in India.

Geography
It belongs to Rohtak Division. It is located 33 km west of Jhajjar, 18 km from Matanhail and 298 km from State capital Chandigarh. The village is rather closer to Charkhi Dadri than Jhajjar city to on the border of the Jhajjar District and Bhiwani District.

It lies south of Indira Gandhi Super Thermal Power Project, Khanpur Kalan lies to west of Khanpur Khurd. Other nearby villages are Khorra to north-west, Bahu to south-west, Jholri to south, Goria to south-east.

Demography
Total population of Khanpur Khurd as per 2011 census is approximately 7644 with 726 families, with 81.06% literacy, 86.91% and 65.66% male and female literacy respectively.

Language
The language spoken is haryanvi.

Administration
The village has its own panchayat under panchayat raj.

Economy
Village economy is agriculture based and it is also the location of Indira Gandhi Super Thermal Power Project which lies between Khanur Khurd, Khanpur Kalan and Jharli.

External links
 Khanpur Khurd Google location map

See also

 Dhillon
 Indira Gandhi Super Thermal Power Project

References

Villages in Jhajjar district